Eileen Aice Izabella Crowe (2 March 1899 – 8 May 1978) was an Irish actress. She was born Dublin, Ireland. She was married to Peter Judge, an actor whose stage name was F. J. McCormick.

Career 
Eileen had a career with the Abbey Theatre from 1921 to 1970.

She appeared in many films from 1936–1964 including The Plough and the Stars (1936), The Quiet Man (1952), Home is the Hero (1959) and Girl with Green Eyes (1964).

Between 1931–1953 she appeared in the Abbey Theatre productions of plays by Irish playwright Teresa Deevy including A Disciple (1931), Katie Roche (1936), (1937), (1949), (1953), Temporal Powers (1932), (1937) and The Reapers (1930).

Early life 
Born Alice Izabella at Carlingford Terrace in Drumcondra, Crowe was one of ten children born to grocer Moses Crowe and Therese Eglinton.

Later life and death 
Upon her entry to the Abbey School of Acting, Crowe made her debut in 1921 in the play The revolutionist, taking the lead role of Nora Mangan. Crowe played her last role of Miss Hatty in 'Grogan and the ferret', after which retired. During these near five decades, she starred in many plays, some of which included The marriage of Columbine (1921) and Juno and the Paycock (1924). Even more, following her film debut in 1925 in The Land of her Fathers, Crowe made her last film appearance in Girl with Green Eyes, which debuted in 1964. That same year she appeared in the Aldwych Theatre's production of Juno and the Paycock in London. She worked in the Abbey for the vast majority of her career, except for when she was on a six month tour for Peg O' My Heart, touring Northern Ireland and England.

In 1924, when the play Grasshopper was being produced, Crowe met her husband Peter Judge, also known as F.J. McCormick. They got married in 1925, and later on they had a daughter and a son.

Crowe passed away on the 8 May 1978, and was buried in the Deansgrange Cemetery in Blackrock, County Dublin, Ireland, with her husband.

Legacy 
Eileen Crowe died on 8 May 1978 aged 79 and was buried in Dublin, Ireland.

After a 49 year long career with the Abbey Theater performing alongside her husband F.J. McCormick, she is now remembered as a devoted artist and a devoted wife. The couple had two children, a son and a daughter.

Playography 
 A Disciple 1931
 Katie Roche 1936, 1937, 1949, 1953
 Temporal Powers 1932, 1937
 The Reapers 1930

Filmography

References

External links 
 Eileen Crowe at the Abbey Theatre Archives
 Eileen Crowe at Teresa Deevy Archive
 

1899 births
1978 deaths
Irish stage actresses
Irish film actresses
20th-century Irish actresses
Actresses from Dublin (city)